Old, New, Borrowed, and Blue is the eleventh solo studio album by the English singer-songwriter Paul Carrack. It was originally released in 2007 on Carrack's own Carrack-UK label.

As the title implies, the album is a mixture of recordings of various vintages—some old, some new—cover (i.e., "borrowed") songs, and songs that have a soul or blues influence.  Two songs are re-mixes of Carrack originals, originally from his 1996 album Blue Views.  Track 4 was recorded with the Belgian jazz duo Gare du Nord and initially issued on their 2007 album Sex 'N' Jazz.  Other songs are outtakes from earlier album projects, songs recorded for tribute albums, and newly recorded tracks.

Track listing

Personnel
 Paul Carrack – vocals, all other instruments (1, 2, 3, 5, 6, 7, 9, 13), all instruments (10), keyboards (11, 12)
 Emiel van Rijthoven – keyboards (4)
 Gare du Nord (Ferdi Lancee & Barend Fransen) – all other instruments (4)
 Hervé Martens – keyboards (8), original arrangements (8)
 Rod Argent – keyboards (11, 12)
 Nigel Bates – guitars (3)
 "Little" Chris Pocino – guitars (8)
 Robbie McIntosh – guitars (11, 12)
 Tim Renwick – guitars (11, 12)
 Roberto Mercurio – bass guitar (8)
 Pino Palladino – bass guitar (11, 12)
 Joris Peeters – drums (8)
 Andy Newmark – drums (11, 12)
 Steve Beighton – saxophones (1, 2, 5, 6, 7, 9)
 Ed Collins – trumpet (2, 6, 7, 9)
 Bob Loveday – violin (13)
 Gyuri Spies – string arrangements (8)
 Dirk Brossé – string conductor (8)
 Lindsay Dracass – vocals (8)
 Katie Kisson – backing vocals (11, 12)
 Tessa Niles – backing vocals (11, 12)

Production
 Paul Carrack – producer (1, 2, 3, 5-13)
 Gare du Nord (Ferdi Lancee & Barend Fransen) – producers (4)
 Hervé Martens – original production (8)
 Peter Van Hooke – original production (9, 12)
 Nigel Bates – mixing, mastering
 Jan Servaes – string recording (8)
 Ian Ross – design, album concept 
 Deborah Stone – front cover photography, photography on pages 4 & 9
 Danny Clifford – inlay photography, photography on pages 6 & 7

References

External links

2007 albums
Paul Carrack albums